Ralph Hamilton Roberts  (26 September 1935 – 19 March 2023) was a New Zealand sailor and sports administrator.

Roberts was born in 1935 in Takapuna, Auckland, New Zealand.

Roberts went to the 1960 Summer Olympics in Rome and competed in the Finn class, where he came sixth out of 35 competitors. He travelled to the 1964 Summer Olympics in Tokyo as a reserve for the Flying Dutchman crew of Helmer Pedersen and Earle Wells, who went on to win Olympic gold. At the 1968 Summer Olympics in Mexico City, he came eighth in the Flying Dutchman class.

Roberts attended the 1984 Summer Olympics in Los Angeles as sailing manager, and his team won two gold medals (in the Tornado and Finn classes) and one bronze medal (in the Windglider class). Roberts was Chef de Mission for the 1992 New Zealand Olympic team in Barcelona.

Roberts presided over Yachting New Zealand from 1986 to 1989. In the 1993 Queen's Birthday Honours, He was appointed a Member of the Order of the British Empire, for services to yachting. Roberts held several positions with the International Sailing Federation (ISAF; since renamed to World Sailing). He was appointed a life member of Yachting New Zealand in 2011.

Roberts resided in Takapuna where his house fronted Lake Pupuke, and was a member of the Harbour Access Trust. Roberts described fellow Olympic sailor and North Shore resident, Geoff Smale, as his "best mate" after Smale died in a Dyn'Aéro microlight crash in 2011.

He died on 19 March 2023 at the age of 87.

References

External links
 
 
 

1935 births
2023 deaths
People from Takapuna
New Zealand male sailors (sport)
Olympic sailors of New Zealand
Sailors at the 1960 Summer Olympics – Finn
Sailors at the 1968 Summer Olympics – Flying Dutchman
New Zealand Members of the Order of the British Empire
New Zealand sports executives and administrators
New Zealand justices of the peace
Sportspeople from Auckland